Ruffin-Roulhac House, also known as Little Hawfields, is a historic home located at Hillsborough, Orange County, North Carolina, United States.  It was built about 1820, and is a -story, five bay, frame dwelling including a two-room addition built about 1830.  It is topped by a gable roof, is sheathed in weatherboard, and has a one-bay 20th century replacement porch.  The interior has Federal, Greek Revival, and Victorian style design elements.  It was the home of jurist Thomas Ruffin (1787–1870) from after the end of the American Civil War until his death in 1870.

The house has since been converted into town offices for the town of Hillsborough.

It was listed on the National Register of Historic Places in 1971.  It is located in the Hillsborough Historic District.

References

External links

Historic American Buildings Survey in North Carolina
Houses on the National Register of Historic Places in North Carolina
Federal architecture in North Carolina
Greek Revival houses in North Carolina
Victorian architecture in North Carolina
Houses completed in 1820
Hillsborough, North Carolina
Houses in Orange County, North Carolina
National Register of Historic Places in Orange County, North Carolina
Individually listed contributing properties to historic districts on the National Register in North Carolina